A photographic essay or photo-essay for short is a form of visual storytelling, a way to present a narrative through a series of images. A photo essay delivers a story using a series of photographs and brings the viewer along a narrative journey.

Examples of photo essays include:

 A web page or portion of a web site.
 A single montage or collage of photographic images, with text or other additions, intended to be viewed both as a whole and as individual photographs. Such a work may also fall in the category of mixed media.
 An art show which is staged at a particular time and location. Some such shows may also fall into other categories.
 In fashion publishing especially, a photo-editorial – an editorial-style article dominated by or entirely consisting of a series of thematic photographs.

Photographers known for their photo-essays include:
 W. Eugene Smith
 Ansel Adams
Adams's Born Free and Equal (1944) documented Japanese Americans held at the Manzanar War Relocation Center during World War II.
 Gordon Parks’ A Harlem Family are acclaimed for showing a glimpse into the lives of the sick and impoverished.
 James Nachtwey
 William Klein
 Peter Funch’s much-reposted photo series, for which Funch photographed the same street corner for nine years.

Photo-essays moved from printed press to the web.

See also
Charticle
Photojournalism
Photography
Art

References

External links
Photo Essay at Time
Photography